Péter Halmosi (born 25 September 1979) is a Hungarian retired professional footballer who played as a midfielder. At international level, he won 35 caps for his country. His previous clubs include Szombathelyi Haladás, Grazer AK, Debrecen, Plymouth Argyle and Hull City.

Biography
Born in the ancient western city of Szombathely, Halmosi grew up in a family with significant sporting background. His father, Zoltán, won 11 caps playing for Hungary, and his mother also was involved in professional sport, representing Hungary as an athlete at several international events.

Career
Halmosi played his first game for his hometown club Szombathelyi Haladás at the age of 18 and stayed at the club until he was 23. In 2002, he joined Austrian side Grazer AK making 17 appearances and scoring 3 goals for the club. After playing several games for the reserves he returned to Hungary signing for Debrecen. His move to Debrecen turned out to be a successful stay and he spent four years with the club.

Halmosi next joined Plymouth Argyle, initially on loan until the end of the 2006–07 season, with a view to a permanent move at the end of the season. A £400,000 permanent deal with Argyle was completed on 16 May 2007, making him the record signing for the club at that time. He had been linked with moves to other clubs in the United Kingdom including Celtic and Blackburn Rovers. Halmosi made his Argyle debut in a 3–1 away win against Norwich City on 13 January 2007.

On 15 July 2008, Halmosi was spotted at Hull City's pre-season friendly against North Ferriby United. One day later, he signed a four-year contract with Hull for a fee in excess of £2 million, becoming, at the time, their record signing and their 6th of the summer. He made his Hull debut in the friendly match against Chesterfield on 22 July 2008 at Saltergate. His competitive debut came shortly after the hour mark in Hull City's first ever top flight game, against Fulham on 16 August 2008, as a substitute for Nick Barmby. He scored his first goal for the club in an FA Cup victory over against Sheffield United on 14 February 2009. On the final day of the January transfer window Halmosi joined Hungarian side Szombathelyi Haladas on loan until the end of the 2009–10 season.

On 4 January 2011, Halmosi left Hull City by mutual consent. Ten days later, he returned to Szombathelyi Haladás on a three and a half year contract.

Career statistics

Club

Other includes the UEFA Champions League and UEFA Cup.

International

Honours
Debrecen
 Hungarian League: 2005, 2006
 Hungarian Super Cup: 2005, 2006

Szombathelyi Haladás
 Hungarian Cup runner-up: 2002

Individual
 Named in the Hungarian National Championship I all-star team (nemzetisport.hu):  2010–11
 Zilahi Prize: 2005

References

External links
 Péter Halmosi at magyarfutball.hu

1979 births
Living people
Sportspeople from Szombathely
Hungarian footballers
Hungary international footballers
Association football midfielders
Szombathelyi Haladás footballers
Grazer AK players
Debreceni VSC players
Plymouth Argyle F.C. players
Hull City A.F.C. players
Nemzeti Bajnokság I players
Austrian Football Bundesliga players
English Football League players
Premier League players
Hungarian expatriate footballers
Expatriate footballers in Austria
Expatriate footballers in England
Hungarian expatriate sportspeople in Austria
Hungarian expatriate sportspeople in England